Hugh Freund (born 18 February 1988) is a U.S. Paralympic sailor. He was part of the team that won the silver medal at the 2016 Summer Paralympic games in the Three-Person Keelboat (Sonar) in Rio.

References

Sailors at the 2016 Summer Paralympics
Paralympic silver medalists for the United States
Living people
1988 births
American male sailors (sport)
Medalists at the 2016 Summer Paralympics
Paralympic medalists in sailing
Paralympic sailors of the United States